Rhinomyobia is a genus of parasitic flies in the family Tachinidae. There are at least four described species in Rhinomyobia.

Species
These four species belong to the genus Rhinomyobia:
 Rhinomyobia australis Brauer & Bergenstamm, 1893
 Rhinomyobia minuta (Bezzi, 1928)
 Rhinomyobia plumifera (Bezzi, 1928)
 Rhinomyobia transversalis (Malloch, 1930)

References

Further reading

 
 
 
 

Tachinidae
Articles created by Qbugbot